Highways & Heartaches is the fifth studio album by American country music artist Ricky Skaggs. It was released in 1982 via Epic Records. The album peaked at number 1 on the Billboard Top Country Albums chart.

Track listing

Personnel 

 Ricky Skaggs – lead vocals, acoustic guitar, backing vocals (1, 2, 4, 5, 6), mandolin (2, 4, 8), fiddle (2), electric guitar (6), mandocaster (10)
 Micky Merrett – acoustic piano (1, 8, 10)
 Dennis Burnside – acoustic piano (2, 5)
 Buck White – acoustic piano (3, 4, 6, 7, 9)
 Ray Flacke – electric guitars (1, 7, 8, 10), electric rhythm guitar (9)
 Bruce Bouton – steel guitar (1, 8, 10)
 Lloyd Green – steel guitar (2, 5)
 Weldon Myrick – steel guitar (3, 6, 9)
 Jerry Douglas – dobro (4, 7)
 Béla Fleck – banjo (8)
 Jesse Chambers – bass (1, 7, 10)
 Joe Osborn – bass (2, 3, 5, 6, 8, 9), acoustic bass (4)
 Rodney Price – drums (1, 7, 10)
 Jerry Kroon – drums (2, 3, 5, 6, 8, 9)
 Eddie Bayers – percussion (7)
 Bobby Hicks – fiddle (1, 3, 4, 6, 7, 9, 10)
 George Grantham – backing vocals (1)
 Sharon White-Skaggs – backing vocals (4, 5, 6), harmony vocals (9)
 The Lea Jane Singers – backing vocals (5)

Production 
 Ricky Skaggs – producer 
 Marshall Morgan – assistant producer, engineer, mixing 
 Pat McMakin – assistant engineer 
 Glenn Meadows – mastering at Masterfonics (Nashville, Tennessee)
 Virginia Team – art direction, design 
 Beverly Parker – photography 
 Chip Peay Enterprises – management

Chart performance

References

1982 albums
Ricky Skaggs albums
Epic Records albums
Albums produced by Ricky Skaggs